Charnock Richard Services is a motorway service area between Junctions 27 and 28 of the M6 in England. The services are in the Lancashire borough of Chorley and were the first on the M6 when they opened in 1963. Originally operated by Trust House Forte, the services are currently operated by Welcome Break.

History
In August 1961 the contract was awarded to Motorway Services, owned by Blue Star Garages and Forte. The nearby 29 mile section of M6 opened Monday 29 July 1963. It was the first motorway service area to have a bridge over the motorway.

Keele services was an exact copy of Charnock Richard; Keele opened on Friday 15 November 1963.

Design
The services complex was designed by Terence Verity of Verity Associates.

The fast-food restaurants are located on the bridge over the motorway, rather than restaurants on each side. The bridge restaurant, which had been converted to a Little Chef, was removed in the late 1990s and replaced with Burger King and KFC units at opposite ends of the bridge with a seating area in the middle. This layout remains the same today.

The southbound side has an unusual layout for motorway service areas in the UK, insofar as the fuel forecourt is sited at the top of the entry slip road, on arrival at the complex. The more commonly used layout places the fuel forecourt as the last facility before motorists rejoin the motorway. The design of motorway service areas was still experimental at the time the site was built in the early 1960s, and this arrangement was not repeated.

Satisfaction
The 2019 Motorway Services User Survey found that the southbound side of Charnock Richard was in the worst five motorway services in the United Kingdom for customer satisfaction.

The 2022 Transport Focus survey calculated a 93% satisfaction score for the northbound services and 83% for the southbound services, making it the third-worst in the UK.

References

External links
Welcome Break Motorway Services – Charnock Richard – M6 Motorway
Motorway Services Online – Charnock Richard

M6 motorway service stations
Welcome Break motorway service stations
Transport in Lancashire
Buildings and structures in the Borough of Chorley